Peltonen is a Finnish manufacturer of cross country skis, ski boots and poles.

Peltonen skis are manufactured in Finland at the Peltonen factory in Heinola. Depending on the snow conditions, the Heinola factory produces from 23,000 to 70,000 pairs of skis per year. All product development and almost all manufacturing are done in Heinola.

Since 2002, the Peltonen brand has been owned by Normark, the Finnish distributor for the Rapala corporation. In 2005 Rapala also acquired the majority of shares in Peltonen Ski Oyj.

References

External links
 Official website

Sporting goods manufacturers of Finland
Ski equipment manufacturers
Finnish brands